Eugenia Huici Arguedas de Errázuriz (15 September 1860 – 1951) was a Chilean patron of modernism and a style leader of Paris from 1880 into the 20th century, who paved the way for the modernist minimalist aesthetic that would be taken up in fashion by Coco Chanel. Her circle of friends and protégés included Pablo Picasso, Igor Stravinsky, Jean Cocteau, and the poet Blaise Cendrars. She was of Basque descent.

Biography

Eugenia Huici was born in Bolivia [1860]of Bolivian parents, one of thirteen children born to Ildefonso Huici y Peón, a silver magnate who had fled civil war and moved his family to their estates in La Calera, Chile, then a village in the banks of the Aconcagua river, some sixty kilometers (about forty miles) northeast of Valparaíso. Her mother was Manuela Arguedas. Among her siblings were two sisters, Rosa and Ana, and a brother, José.
She was also an aunt of Patricia Lopez-Willshaw (1912–2010) née Lopez-Huici, who was married to Arturo Lopez-Willshaw (1900–1962).

Eugenia was famous from an early age for her beauty; French nuns supervised the girl's education. The young woman added to her silver-mine inheritance by marrying José Tomás Errázuriz; a young and wealthy landscape painter from a well-known winemaking family. Her first years of marriage were spent at Panquehue Errázuriz, the family's wine estate, where she had a son who died soon after birth; the couple eventually had three surviving children:  Maximiliano, Carmen, and María. She soon convinced her husband to move to Paris in 1882, where his brother-in-law Ramón Subercaseaux Vicuña was the Chilean consul and was married to Amalia Errázuriz, a beauty who had been painted by John Singer Sargent.

The couple settled in Paris, where Eugenia attracted a high-profile following. In the autumn of that year, they met John Singer Sargent while they were visiting Venice, possibly on their honeymoon, and seeing José's brother who had taken a studio with Sargent at the Palazzo Rezzonico. Described as an extraordinary beauty, with a beaked nose and raven hair, she was painted by Sargent (who had previously painted Madame Subercaseaux in 1880). Sargent became very fond of Madame Errázuriz and would paint her several times. Besides Sargent, she was also painted by Jacques-Emile Blanche, Giovanni Boldini, Paul Helleu, Augustus John, Ambrose McEvoy and Pablo Picasso.

After the Errázuriz settled in Paris, they became friends with many in the same circle as the Subercaseauxes: the American heiress Winnareta Singer; the French composer Gabriel Fauré; French painters Joseph Roger-Jourdain, Ernest Duez, and Paul Helleu; and the Italian artist Giovanni Boldini. Eugenia was an avid supporter of the arts and she sought out artists, supporting both Stravinsky and Diaghilev at one point, and establishing friendships with such noted writers and musicians as Walter Sickert, Baron Adolph de Meyer, Jean Cocteau and Cecil Beaton.

Around 1900, the Errázurizes relocated to Chelsea, London. José Tomás Errázuriz fell sick with tuberculosis and spent much time in Switzerland; the couple became estranged before he died in 1927. After a six-year stay in London, Eugenia Errazuriz relocated to Biarritz. She then took up with her homosexual opium-taking nephew, Antonio de Gandarillas, known as Tony – the only child of her sister Rosa and Senator José Antonio Gandarillas Luco – and Tony's companion, an aspiring painter named Christopher Wood. Tony and Eugenia also became friends of Sergei Diaghilev and of Artur Rubinstein. Pablo Picasso adored her (she became known as "Picasso's Other Mother"); and in the summer of 1918, he and his new wife, Olga Khokhlova, spent their honeymoon in her villa near Biarritz.

Assessment

Her villa, La Mimoseraie, was the design laboratory in which she elevated simplicity to an art form. In 1910, wrote Richardson, "she already stood out for the unconventional sparseness of her rooms, for her disdain of poufs and potted palms and too much passementerie.... She appreciated things that were very fine and simple, above all, things made of linen, cotton, deal, or stone, whose quality improved with laundering or fading, scrubbing or polishing. She attended to the smallest detail in her house". For her, Elegance means elimination. Errazuriz hung curtains of unlined linen, and whitewashed the walls like a peasant's home – a shocking decorating approach in 1914. I love my house as it looks very clean and very poor! she boasted.

Cecil Beaton noted the red-tile floors that were carpetless but spotlessly clean. He also wrote of her in The Glass of Fashion:  Her effect on the taste of the last fifty years has been so enormous that the whole aesthetic of modern interior decoration, and many of the concepts of simplicity...generally acknowledged today, can be laid at her remarkable doorstep. Her tea table offered simple fare (no "vulgar" cakes), according to Beaton, who noted that her toast "was a work of art." Her niece rhapsodized, Everything in Aunt Eugenia's house smelled so good. It was reported that the towels smelled of lavender, and that she washed her hair in rainwater. Errazuriz detested matched sets of furniture, knick-knacks and mementos. Ruthless on the subject of disorder – even down to the bureau drawers – she ordered: Throw out and keep throwing out. This was an extension of her belief in the necessity of constant change: A house that does not alter, she liked to say, is a dead house. Errazuriz projected her purist mode into every corner of her life. If the kitchen is not as well kept as the salon . . . you cannot have a beautiful house, she declared.

The designer Jean-Michel Frank became her most gifted disciple. Jean Cocteau introduced Blaise Cendrars to her, who proved a supportive if at times possessive patron. Around 1918 he visited her house and was so taken with the simplicity of the décor, he was inspired to write the sequence of poems D'Oultremer à Indigo (From Ultramarine to Indigo). He stayed with Eugenia in her house in Biarritz, in a room decorated with murals by Pablo Picasso.

Late in Life, Eugenia Errázuriz became a tertiary Franciscan (a lay nun), outfitted in a plain black habit designed by another minimalist, Coco Chanel. A fitting environment for this wardrobe was never built. Although Le Corbusier was commissioned to design her beach house in Chile, she let the project lapse before she died in Santiago in 1951, hit by a car while crossing a street at the age of 91. The house, to be known as Villa Eugenia, was eventually built in Japan.

See also
José Tomás Errázuriz

References

External links
"The Queen Of Clean"
Short biography 
Modernist Muse: Eugenia Errazuriz

1860 births
1951 deaths
Eugenia
Chilean women
Chilean people of Basque descent
French socialites
French designers
French interior designers
Road incident deaths in Chile